Barbus paytonii is a doubtfully distinct ray-finned fish species in the family Cyprinidae. It is found only in Morocco.

Its natural habitat is rivers. It is threatened by habitat loss.

The taxonomy and systematics of the Maghreb barbs are subject to considerable dispute. Some authors consider B. paytonii a distinct species, while others include it in Carasobarbus fritschii.

References
 Crivelli, A.J. 2005.  Barbus paytonii.   2006 IUCN Red List of Threatened Species.   Downloaded on 19 July 2007.

Endemic fauna of Morocco
Fish described in 1911
Taxonomy articles created by Polbot